The Berlin Zoological Garden is the oldest surviving and best-known zoo in Germany. With about 1,380 different species and over 20,200 animals, the zoo presents one of the most comprehensive collections of species in the world.

The zoo and its aquarium had more than 3.5 million visitors in 2017. It is the most-visited zoo in Europe and one of the most popular worldwide. Regular animal feedings are among its most famous attractions. Globally known animals like Knut, the polar bear, and Bao Bao, the giant panda have contributed to the zoo's public image.

The zoo collaborates with many universities, research institutes, and other zoos around the world. It maintains and promotes European breeding programmes, helps safeguard several endangered species, and participates in several species reintroduction programs.

History 

Opened on 1 August 1844, the Zoologischer Garten Berlin was the second zoo in Germany after the short-lived "Thiergarten" in Hamburg-Horn. The aquarium opened in 1913. The first animals were donated by Frederick William IV, King of Prussia, from the menagerie at Pfaueninsel island and pheasantry of the Tiergarten. The nearby U-Bahn station was opened in 1882.

Third Reich
In 1938, the Berlin Zoo got rid of Jewish board members and forced Jewish shareholders to sell their stocks at a loss, before re-selling the stocks in an effort to "Aryanize" the institution. Starting in 1939, Jews were also prevented from visiting the zoo. Zoo director Lutz Heck was named chief of the Oberste Naturschütz Behörde im Reichsforstamt (highest nature preservation agency in the state department of forestry) by his friend Hermann Göring in the summer of 1938 and in this capacity he was the senior responsible person for the entire nature management.

World War II
During World War II, the zoo area was hit by Allied bombs for the first time on 8 September 1941. Most damage was done during the bombardments on 22 and 23 November 1943.

In less than 15 minutes, 30% of the zoo population was killed on the first day, and on the second day the aquarium building was completely destroyed by a direct hit. Of the eight elephants, only one survived, the bull Siam, and 2-year-old hippo bull Knautschke was saved from the gunfire in his animal house. Most damage was done during the Battle of Berlin: from 22 April 1945 onwards, the zoo was under constant artillery fire of the Red Army. Heavy fighting took place on the zoo area till 30 April, and safety measures forced the zoo keepers to kill some predators and other dangerous animals.

Next to the zoo stood the Zoo Tower, a huge flak tower that was one of the last remaining areas of Nazi German resistance against the Red Army, with its bunkers and anti-aircraft weapons defending against Allied air forces. At the entrance of the zoo, there was a small underground shelter for zoo visitors and keepers. During the battle, wounded German soldiers were taken care for here by female personnel and the wives of zookeepers. On 30 April, the zoo flak bunker surrendered.

A count on 31 May 1945 revealed only 91 of 3,715 animals had survived, including two lion cubs, two hyenas, Asian bull elephant Siam, hippo bull Knautschke, ten hamadryas baboons, a chimpanzee, and a black stork. After the battle, some animals had escaped, while some of the killed animals were subsequently eaten by Red Army soldiers.

Following the zoo's destruction, it and the associated aquarium was reconstructed on modern principles so as to display the animals in as close to their natural environment as feasible. The success in breeding animals, including some rare species, demonstrates the efficacy of these new methods.

Postwar period
The zoo came to be located in West Berlin, hence a second zoo – Tierpark Berlin – was built in the East.
There was virtually no public attention paid to the zoo's Third Reich history until 2000, when Werner Cohn, whose father was a former shareholder, wrote to enquire about the fate of those shares. The zoo initially denied that Jewish shareholders were forced to sell their shares, but as a public scandal ensued, it ultimately acknowledged this. It commissioned a historian to identify these past shareholders and track down their descendants, according to a report by AFP.

Zoo 

The Berlin Zoo is the most visited zoo in Europe, with more than 3.3 million visitors per year from all over the world. It is open all year long and can easily be reached by public transportation. The Berlin Zoologischer Garten railway station (also simply known as Zoo) is one of Berlin's most important stations. Several modes of transport such as U-Bahn, S-Bahn and buses are interlinked here. 

Visitors can either enter the zoo through the exotically designed Elephant Gate beside the aquarium on Budapester Straße or through the Lion Gate on Hardenbergplatz. The original Elephant Gate, built in 1899, was destroyed in World War II. It was faithfully reconstructed to original plans in 1984.  

The zoo has always maintained an extensive and diverse collection. At the outbreak of World War II there were 4000 birds and mammals of 1400 species, while the aquarium held 8300 reptiles, amphibians and invertebrates of 750 species. In 2001, the combined collection numbered 14188 animals of 1517 species, similar to present. The number of larger animals displayed has gradually thinned as enclosures become increasingly designed to recreate natural habitat.

The zoo maintains studbooks for black and Indian rhinoceroses and gaurs. The populations of rare deer and pigs are part of several captive breeding projects.

The zoo houses four types of great ape: orangutans, gorillas, chimpanzees, and bonobos.

The carnivore house displays all big cats and many rare small predators, such as ring-tailed mongooses and narrow-striped mongooses from Madagascar. In the basement, visitors are invited to a view into the world of nocturnal animals.

The bird house presents a walk-through aviary and offers a broad variety of forms, including several regularly breeding species of hornbills and many parrots. Numerous big aviaries show waders, herons and many other species. The Berlin Zoo is one of the few zoos to exhibit tuatara (in the aquarium) and Luzon tarictic hornbills.

Aquarium 

The aquarium was built in 1913 as part of the Zoologischer Garten complex. In addition to fish and other aquatic life, it is home to most of the zoo's reptiles, amphibians and invertebrates.

Animals 

Polar bear Knut was born in captivity at the zoo on 5 December 2006. He and his twin brother or sister were directly rejected by their mother on the day of birth. He was subsequently raised by zookeeper Thomas Dörflein and became the center of a mass media phenomenon that spanned the globe, quickly spawning numerous toys, media specials, DVDs, and books.  Because of this, the cub was largely responsible for a significant increase in revenue, estimated at five million euros, at the Berlin Zoo in 2007. Zoo attendance figures for the year increased by an estimated 30%, making it the most profitable year in its 165-year history. Knut died on 19 March 2011 after collapsing in his exhibit.

Bao Bao (1978–2012) was one of the first two giant pandas in Germany and became – for a time – the oldest known panda in zoos. He was together with the female panda Tjen Tjen (who died in 1984) given to West Germany by China in 1980. Between 1991 and 1993 Bao Bao was loaned to London Zoo. In 1995, back in his Berlin home, another female named Yan Yan was sent on loan from China in an attempt to mate Bao Bao. In spite of several artificial insemination experiments there were no offspring. Yan Yan died in 2007. In summer 2017, giant pandas returned to Berlin, when Jiao Quing and Meng Meng arrived on breeding loan from China. In September 2019, Meng Meng gave birth to twin panda cubs.

Fatou the female gorilla was born on 13 April 1957. She came to the zoo at an estimated age of two. In 1974 she gave birth to the first gorilla to be raised in Berlin, Dufte. Since the death of Colo in January 2017, she is the oldest living gorilla in captivity of the world (now together with American gorilla Trudy).

Incidents
In 2008, Claudia Hämmerling, a Green Party MP, accused the zoo director, Bernhard Blaszkiewitz (also the director of Tierpark Berlin), of selling hundred of animals for slaughter, in some cases to breeders in China for potency-boosting drugs.  The same year, Blaszkiewitz admitted to breaking the necks of several feral domestic housecat kittens found at the zoo. 

In 2009, a woman was mauled by polar bears after jumping into their exhibit. She was rushed to the hospital and survived.

See also 
 List of zoos in Germany
 Zoo flak tower, built in 1941, demolished in 1947

References

External links

 

 
Zoological Garden
Zoological Garden
Zoological Garden
Zoos in Germany
Zoos established in 1844
1844 establishments in Prussia